Ellen Bradshaw Aitken (1964-2014) was a Canadian New Testament scholar and the dean of Faculty of Religious Studies at McGill University.   She was an ordained Episcopal priest.  She was a founder of the Anglican Association of Biblical Scholars.    She was “an expert in early Christian Studies, with emphasis on Hellenistic and Roman contexts…”

References

1964 births
2014 deaths
Academic staff of McGill University
Harvard College alumni
Harvard Divinity School alumni
Sewanee: The University of the South alumni
New Testament scholars